In probability theory, Wald's equation, Wald's identity or Wald's lemma is an important identity that simplifies the calculation of the expected value of the sum of a random number of random quantities. In its simplest form, it relates the expectation of a sum of randomly many finite-mean, independent and identically distributed random variables to the expected number of terms in the sum and the random variables' common expectation under the condition that the number of terms in the sum is independent of the summands.

The equation is named after the mathematician Abraham Wald. An identity for the second moment is given by the Blackwell–Girshick equation.

Basic version
Let  be a sequence of real-valued, independent and identically distributed random variables and let  be an integer-value random variable that is independent of the sequence . Suppose that  and the  have finite expectations. Then

Example
Roll a six-sided dice. Take the number on the die (call it ) and roll that number of six-sided dice to get the numbers , and add up their values.  By Wald's equation, the resulting value on average is

General version 
Let  be an infinite sequence of real-valued random variables and let  be a nonnegative integer-valued random variable. 

Assume that:

.  are all integrable (finite-mean) random variables,
.  for every natural number , and
. the infinite series satisfies

 

Then the random sums

are integrable and

If, in addition,
.  all have the same expectation, and
.  has finite expectation,

then

Remark: Usually, the name Wald's equation refers to this last equality.

Discussion of assumptions
Clearly, assumption is needed to formulate assumption and Wald's equation. Assumption controls the amount of dependence allowed between the sequence  and the number  of terms; see the counterexample below for the necessity. Note that assumption   is satisfied when    is a stopping time for the sequence . Assumption is of more technical nature, implying absolute convergence and therefore allowing arbitrary rearrangement of an infinite series in the proof.

If assumption is satisfied, then assumption can be strengthened to the simpler condition

. there exists a real constant  such that  for all natural numbers .

Indeed, using assumption,

and the last series equals the expectation of  [Proof], which is finite by assumption. Therefore, and  imply assumption.

.  is independent of the sequence  and
. there exists a constant  such that  for all natural numbers .

. the random variables  all have the same distribution.

Note that the random variables of the sequence  don't need to be independent.

The interesting point is to admit some dependence between the random number  of terms and the sequence . A standard version is to assume,, and the existence of a filtration  such that
.  is a stopping time with respect to the filtration, and

This implies, and together with  it implies.

For convenience (see the proof below using the optional stopping theorem) and to specify the relation of the sequence  and the filtration , the following additional assumption is often imposed:

Note that and  together imply that the random variables  are independent.

Application
An application is in actuarial science when considering the total claim amount follows a compound Poisson process

within a certain time period, say one year, arising from a random number  of individual insurance claims, whose sizes are described by the random variables . Under the above assumptions, Wald's equation can be used to calculate the expected total claim amount when information about the average claim number per year and the average claim size is available.

Examples

Example with dependent terms
Define  for all .

Example where the number of terms depends on the sequence
Let  be a sequence of independent, symmetric, and }-valued random variables. Note that , hence  by the ratio test. However, does not hold, because  is defined in terms of the sequence . Intuitively, one might expect to have  in this example, because the summation stops right after a one, thereby apparently creating a positive bias. However, Wald's equation shows that this intuition is misleading.

Counterexamples

A counterexample illustrating the necessity of assumption
Consider a sequence  of i.i.d. (Independent and identically distributed random variables) random variables, taking each of the two values 0 and 1 with probability  (actually, only  is needed in the following). Define .

A counterexample illustrating the necessity of assumption
Let  be the first  such that . Then, as above,  has finite expectation, hence assumption holds. Since  for all , assumptions and  hold. However, since  almost surely, Wald's equation cannot hold.

Therefore, only assumption can fail, and indeed, since

and therefore  for every , it follows that

A proof using the optional stopping theorem
Using assumption, define the sequence of random variables

Assumption implies that the conditional expectation of  given  equals  almost surely for every , hence  is a martingale with respect to the filtration  by assumption. Assumptions, and  make sure that we can apply the optional stopping theorem, hence  is integrable and

Due to assumption,

and due to assumption this upper bound is integrable.

Remark: Note that this proof does not cover the above example with dependent terms.

General proof 
This proof uses only Lebesgue's monotone and dominated convergence theorems.
We prove the statement as given above in three steps.

Step 1: Integrability of the random sum  
We first show that the random sum  is integrable. Define the partial sums

The Lebesgue monotone convergence theorem implies that

By the triangle inequality,

Using this upper estimate and changing the order of summation (which is permitted because all terms are non-negative), we obtain

where the second inequality follows using the monotone convergence theorem. By assumption, the infinite sequence on the right-hand side of  converges, hence  is integrable.

Step 2: Integrability of the random sum  
We now show that the random sum  is integrable. Define the partial sums

of real numbers.

As in step 1, the Lebesgue monotone convergence theorem implies that

By the triangle inequality,

Using this upper estimate and changing the order of summation (which is permitted because all terms are non-negative), we obtain

By assumption,

Substituting this into yields

which is finite by assumption, hence  is integrable.

Step 3: Proof of the identity 

where we used assumption and the dominated convergence theorem with dominating random variable  for the second equality. Due to assumption and the σ-additivity of the probability measure,

By using dominated convergence again with dominating random variable ,

This completes the proof.

Further generalizations
 Wald's equation can be transferred to -valued random variables  by applying the one-dimensional version to every component.
 If  are Bochner-integrable random variables taking values in a Banach space, then the general proof above can be adjusted accordingly.

See also

 Lorden's inequality
 Wald's martingale
 Spitzer's formula

Notes

References

External links
 

Probability theory
Articles containing proofs
Actuarial science